Calvin Adams (born January 4, 1962) is a Canadian football cornerback who played for the Hamilton Tiger-Cats of the Canadian Football League. He played in four games for the Tiger-Cats during the 1986 season, catching two interceptions and fumbling once. He became a Grey Cup champion that year after the Tiger-Cats defeated the Edmonton Eskimos 39–15 in the 74th Grey Cup.

References 

1962 births
American football cornerbacks
Canadian football defensive backs
East Carolina Pirates football players
Hamilton Tiger-Cats players
Players of Canadian football from North Carolina
Players of American football from North Carolina
Living people